Warwick William Waugh (born 17 September 1968) is a former Australia national rugby union team player who played 8 tests for Australia between 1993 and 1997. His position was lock. He made his debut against the Springbok in Sydney during 1993 and he played his final match against Argentina national rugby union team. He also played for the Randwick Rugby Club.

Towards the end of his career Waugh played for Connacht Rugby in Ireland, joining the side from Béziers in 2002.

References 

1968 births
Living people
Australian rugby union players
Australia international rugby union players
Connacht Rugby players
People educated at Scots College (Sydney)
Rugby union locks
Rugby union players from Queensland